Hrushvytsia Persha is a village in Rivne Raion, Rivne Oblast, Ukraine. As of the year 2001, the community had 940 residents.

Villages in Rivne Raion